The Agassiz Association was a society founded in 1875 for the study of natural science, named for Swiss-American naturalist Louis Agassiz. Its founder and first president was Harlan Hoge Ballard (1853–1934).

History
According to its Constitution, the Agassiz Association's purpose was "to collect, study, and preserve natural objects and facts." Each Chapter of the Association was allowed to choose its own officers and make its own by-laws. By 1880 there were chapters in Massachusetts, New York State, and Pennsylvania. By 1884 the Association had about 7000 members and about 600 Chapters. For some years, St. Nicholas Magazine was the official organ of communication between the Association and its members. The Association was incorporated in 1892. Ballard's successor as president was Edward F. Bigelow. The American Fern Society and the Wilson Ornithological Society originated as Chapters of the Agassiz Association.

Natural theology

References

Scientific societies based in the United States
1875 establishments in Massachusetts
Scientific organizations established in 1875
Defunct clubs and societies of the United States
Clubs and societies in the United States
Organizations established in 1875